This article shows the rosters of all participating teams at the women's handball tournament at the 2015 Pan American Games in Toronto. Rosters can have a maximum of 15 athletes.

The Argentine women's handball team that will compete at the 2015 Pan American Games:

Head coach: Eduardo Peruchena

Brazil announced their squad on June 16, 2015. Fabiana Diniz was ruled out because of a deep vein thrombosis and was replaced by Elaine Gomes.

Head coach:  Morten Soubak

Canada announced their squad on May 4, 2015.

Head coach: Juan Moreno

Head coach: Maturell

Niurkis Mora
Milena Mesa
Ayling Martínez
Livia Varanes
Raiza Beltran
Niuris Ferrer
Lizandra Lusson
Gleinys Reyes
Yunisleidy Camejo
Ismary Barrio
Eneleidis Guevara
Lisandra Espinosa
Yenma Ramírez
Marines Rojas
Eyatne Rizo

coach: Monica Piña

Itzel Aguirre
Tania Navarro
Guadalupe Saavedra
Fernanda Rivera
Violeta Yedra
Denisse Romo
Laura Morales
Marlene Sosa
Nashely Jaramillo
Lucero Quezada
Maria Rocha
Manuela Zavala
Anali Favela
Belen Aguirre
Selene Sifuentes

coach: Camilo Estevez

Adriana Cabrera
Kitsa Escobar
Nathalys Ceballos
Sheila Hiraldo
Jereny Espinal
Joane Vergara
Natalie Cabello
Fabiola Martínez
Nicolette Pope
Jailene Maldonado
Zugeily Soto
Erika Graciani
Ciris García
Lilianushka Natal
Zuleika Fuentes

Uruguay announced their squad on July 6, 2015.

Patricia Ré
Paola Santos
Paula Fynn
Soledad Faedo
Alejandra Scarrone
Daniela Scarrone
Alejandra Ferrari
Camila Barreiro
Martina Barreiro
Eliana Falco
Federica Cura
Leticia Schinca
Camila Vázquez
Viviana Ferrari
Iara Grosso

References

Handball at the 2015 Pan American Games
Pan American Games handball squads